is a 2015 drama film directed by Mitsutoshi Tanaka starring Seiyo Uchino, Kenan Ece and Shioli Kutsuna. Two historical incidents that deepened the friendship between Japan and Turkey are connected in this story of friendship and compassion: The sinking of the Turkish frigate Ertuğrul off the Japanese coast in 1890 and the evacuation of Japanese nationals from Iran in 1985. It received the Japan Academy Film Prize in ten categories, including Best Art Direction, Best Sound Recording, Excellent Film and Excellent Director.<ref name="tanakamitutosi_profile">"プロフィール", "Film director Mitsutoshi Tanaka. Retrieved 3 July 2020.</ref> A Japanese-Turkish co-production, the film was produced by Japan's Creators' Union and Toei together with Turkey's Böcek Yapım. It was released in Japan by Toei on 5 December 2015 and in Turkey by CGV Mars on 25 December 2015.

Plot
Ertuğrul episode
In the night of 16 September 1890, while returning from a goodwill visit to Japan, the Turkish frigate Ertuğrul is caught up in a typhoon and sinks in the Pacific Ocean off the coast of Kushimoto, Wakayama. Hearing the alarm bell the villagers of Kashino, a poor fishing village on Kushimoto's island of Kii Oshima, rush to the shore. They are confronted with the grisly spectacle of vast numbers of dead and dying. With more than 500 crew members dead, it is one of the largest sea accidents in history at that time. Risking their own lives, the villagers are able to rescue 69 Turkish sailors. Tamura (Seiyo Uchino), a doctor living in Kashino village, and his assistant Haru (Shioli Kutsuna) treat the injured. In the wake of her life rescuing efforts Haru builds a special bond with Mustafa (Kenan Ece), an officer on the Ertuğrul. Although being very poor and having hardly to eat, the villagers share what little they have with strangers from a country 9,000 kilometers away.

Tehran episode
In the year 1985, during the Iran–Iraq War, Iraq announces an indiscriminate attack and to shoot down any aircraft over Iranian air space. Japanese Ambassador Yutaka Nomura (Toshiyuki Nagashima) requests rescue flights from Japan, but is told that a quick response is not possible. While evacuation flights from other nations are arriving, more than 300 Japanese are stranded in Tehran. Harumi (Shioli Kutsuna), a teacher at the Tehran Japanese School, prevails upon Nomura to ask the Turkish ambassador for help. Turkish Prime Minister Turgut Özal (Deniz Oral) decides to evacuate the Japanese. In the morning of 19 March, only a few hours before Iraq's ultimatum expires, a Turkish Airlines aircraft takes off for Tehran. Not only is Tehran already under heavy rocket fire, but the remaining Turks at Tehran Mehrabad Airport still need to be convinced that they won't be able to board their own country's evacuation flight. That's when Turkish embassy staff Murat (Kenan Ece) starts speaking out to his fellow citizens about the compassion and sacrifice Japanese villagers had shown to Turkish sailors shipwrecked far away a long time ago.

Background
The film was initiated by the residents of Kushimoto, a coastal town in Wakayama Prefecture where the first episode of the film takes place. For a very long time they wanted to make a film about the Ertuğrul story and thus send a message of friendship and peace to the rest of the world. To pursue their goal, Kushimoto Mayor Katsumasa Tashima contacted film director Mitsutoshi Tanaka and the NPO Ertuğrul Saves the World was established in the city of Wakayama. After more than ten years of work the film was completed in 2015, commemorating the 125th anniversary of Japanese-Turkish friendship."「海難1890」特別先行上映舞台挨拶", PIA Kansai, 27 November 2015. Retrieved 22 November 2018. 

Cast
Leading artists
Seiyo Uchino: Motosada Tamura
Kenan Ece: Mustafa/Murat
Shioli Kutsuna: Haru/Harumi
Alican Yücesoy: Bekir

Supporting artists

Yui Natsukawa: Yuki
Toshiyuki Nagashima: Yutaka Nomura
Naoto Takenaka: Kudo
Takashi Sasano: Mayor Sato
Shunsuke Daitoh: Shintaro
: Tome
Yukiyoshi Ozawa: Gentaro Fujimoto
: Kimura
: Shinichi
Yuu Tokui: Heiji
Yukijiro Hotaru: Takeshita
Rino Katase: Sato
Mert Aygün: Ali Efendi
Mehmet Özgür: Âli Bey
Uğur Polat: Osman Pasha (tr)
: Michi Kimura
: Turgut Özal
Hakkı Haluk Cömert: Mahmut
: Naci
Melis Babadağ: Hatice
Tamer Levent: Süleyman Bey
Duygu Sarışın: Turkish Airlines ground staff
Ali Açıkbaş: Ertuğrul crew member
Can Akalın: Hüseyin
Eray Ayaz: Can
Yeliz Çelebi: Müge Sayar
Bertan Dirikolu: Turkish naval officer
Alper Düzen: İhsan Pekel
Yağız Elmastaşoğlu: Salih
: Biwa artist
: Kiyo
Ayhan Işık: Veysel Atasoy
: Tae
Noboru Kaneko: Yamamoto
Momoko Kato (ja): Japanese national in Tehran 
: Kushimoto resident
Naoki Kawano: Mankichi
Marie Kobayashi: Kushimoto resident
Masataka Kobayashi: Japanese embassy staff
Shingo Koike: Naoki Agata
: Mehmet Ali
: Takeo
: Katsu
Emiko Miyazaki: Kushimoto resident
Halit Mızraklı: Selim
Ayami Nakamura: Courtesan in Kushimoto
: Japanese national in Tehran
Akane Owaki: Courtesan in Kushimoto
Oğuz Öztekin: Hayri
Erkan Pekbay: Sarkis
: Nobu
Savaş Satış: Ertuğrul crew member
: Turkish Airlines official
: Miyamoto
Chiyo Takahashi: Courtesan in Kushimoto
Yuusaku Tanaka: Yoshimoto
: Yano
: Fukushima
: Hiroyuki Kimura
: Orhan Suyolcu

Release
Prior to the film's official launch, special screenings took place in Wakayama City on 20 October 2015 and in Fukuoka on 2 November 2015. A novelization by author Mika Toyoda was published on 6 November 2015. During a visit of Japanese Prime Minister Shinzo Abe to Turkey, Abe and Turkish President Recep Tayyip Erdoğan watched a 30-minute promotional version of the film at Yıldız Palace in Istanbul on 13 November 2015. They were joined by director Mitsutoshi Tanaka, actor Kenan Ece and actress Melis Babadağ. Pre-release screenings took place in Kushimoto from 23 to 25 November 2015 and in Osaka on 28 November 2015. After the world premiere on 1 December 2015 in Tokyo, the film was released in Japan on 5 December 2015, screening in 309 movie theaters. At the Marunouchi Toei Theater in Tokyo audiences were greeted by director Mitsutoshi Tanaka and actors Seiyo Uchino, Kenan Ece, Shioli Kutsuna and Yui Natsukawa on the opening day. Following opening galas in Ankara on 22 December 2015 and in Istanbul on 24 December 2015, the film was released in Turkey on 25 December 2015. In Turkey the film screened in 300 movie theaters. The theme song Ertuğrul Türküsü'', sung by Turkish folk singer Kubat, was released on 29 December 2015. In the film, the song is performed by actor Savaş Satış. Since its theatrical release the film has screened around the world, most notably at the 2016 Toronto Japanese Film Festival. A DVD and Blu-ray disc were released by Toei Video on 8 June 2016. Starting in 2021, online screenings took place in various countries, e.g. in the UK in June 2021 and in Canada and the USA in March 2022. The film is available online on demand on most common Japanese streaming platforms, among others on the Japanese site of Amazon Prime Video.

Reception

Box office
In Wakayama Prefecture, where the first part of the film takes place, the film screened in 5 theaters. With 6,247 admissions and ¥6.9 million in ticket sales on its first day it became the highest grossing film on opening day in Wakayama for 2015. Total theatrical revenue was ¥780 million in Japan and ₺4.7 million in Turkey.

Accolades

References

External links
Official website

A Tale of Two Countries Bound by Tragedy and Heroism (Can Akalın, Nikkei Voice)
Ertuğrul Filminde Torunlar Oynuyor (Gökhan Karakaş, Milliyet) 
NPO Ertuğrul Saves the World 
125 Years Memory novel by Mika Toyoda 

Japanese drama films
Turkish drama films
2015 drama films
2015 films
Toei Company films
Japanese multilingual films
Turkish multilingual films
2015 multilingual films
2010s Japanese films